Krasae Sin is a district (amphoe) in the northern part of Songkhla province, southern Thailand.

Geography
Neighboring districts are (from the south clockwise): Sathing Phra of Songkhla Province; Pak Phayun, Bang Kaeo, Khao Chaison, and Mueang Phatthalung of Phatthalung province; and Ranot of Songkhla Province.

The western part of the district is on the shores of Thale Luang and Thale Noi, the northern parts of the Songkhla Lake.

History
The minor district (king amphoe) was created on 16 February 1978, when the three tambons, Choeng Sae, Ko Yai, and Rong, were split off from Ranot district. It was upgraded to a full district on 4 July 1994.

Administration
The district is divided into four sub-districts (tambons), which are further subdivided into 22 villages (mubans). There are no municipal (thesaban) areas within the district; there are a further four tambon administrative organizations (TAO).

References

External links
amphoe.com

Districts of Songkhla province